Sherry E. Lyall (February 1959 – January 15, 1984; later Sherry Hart) was an American mother and murder victim. The crime happened the evening of January 15, 1984 in northwestern North Carolina in Ashe County, North Carolina. Lyall Hart was first reported missing by local sheriff's deputies as a vanishing.

The background
Sherry E. Hart (née Lyall) was the mother of a daughter, April (later April Billings; born 1976 or 1977 depending on information sources). Sherry was a divorcee and was expecting a date on that night; the date, however, stood her up. She then joined friends Richard Lynn Bare (b. July 6, 1964) and Jeffrey Scott "Jeff" Burgess (born 1964 or 1965) that Sunday.

When Lynn Bare started making sexual advances toward Lyall Hart, however, she rebuffed him, at which point Lynn Bare then followed her down, became infuriated and slammed Lyall Hart with his pistol. Right before getting into a 1977 Ford Mustang, Bare began giving orders for Burgess to lead them to an area on the North Carolina Highway 16 near a bar place, almost one quarter-mile from the Blue Ridge Parkway.

Bare then bolted from the Mustang alongside Lyall Hart; the latter was bleeding heavily. Lynn Bare then made Burgess drive down the road, come back, and retrieve Bare. Later, Burgess told law enforcement Lynn Bare had threatened to kill Burgess and his family if he (Burgess) ever told police what happened. Burgess cooperated with police and law enforcement officials regarding what happened the night of Sunday, January 15, 1984 near the Jefferson and West Jefferson area.

Discovery of Hart's body and arrest
On Monday, December 10, 1984 (eleven months following the vanishing of Lyall Hart), her remains were found at the Jumping Off Place.

Burgess and Lynn Bare were arrested three months following the discovery of Lyall Hart's body. On July 17, 1985, before he could be tried, however, Lynn Bare escaped the jail in Wilkes County. Burgess was taken to the Ashe County Jail. The then jailer was terminated two days following this incident.

Later years
Richard Lynn Bare was wanted by police and later Federal Bureau of Investigation (FBI) officials. He was shown on the programs America's Most Wanted and Unsolved Mysteries. Lynn Bare did not smoke and hated when anyone next to him did so. 

As of February 1, 2023, Lynn Bare has not been found or put into custody. Police say he sometimes dresses like a female. In 1993, Bare was almost arrested in Delaware at the home of a relative where he was staying. But several hours before FBI agents got there, Lynn Bare left the area.

Burgess was never tried for Lyall Hart's killing; he died at age 47 in 2012. Burgess had been in and out of jail on separate drug-related charges and breaking and entering.

April Billings (Lyall Hart's daughter) later married and had several children. As of 2022, she still had optimism that Lynn Bare was still alive and being searched for.

See also
 List of fugitives from justice who disappeared

References

1984 murders in the United States
1959 births
1984 deaths
American murder victims
Female murder victims
People murdered in North Carolina
Women in North Carolina
Unsolved murders in the United States
Killings in North Carolina